Kaufering may refer to:
Kaufering, Bavaria
Kaufering concentration camp complex, Nazi concentration camps located near the town
Kaufering station